Alexander William Monteath (22 May 1941 – 9 March 2021) was a Scottish television actor and broadcaster. He was best known for playing the part of crofter Dougal Lachlan in Take the High Road from 1980 until 1992. 

Monteath was born in Doune, Perthshire in May 1941. He served as an announcer for Scottish Television from 1964 until 1969 and later for BBC Scotland. His son David has been an actor on Coronation Street.

In January 1992, it was announced that his character would be retired from Take the High Road. Monteath said he was "paying the price for one too many rows with the series' scriptwriters".

In November 2021, it was announced by Equity that Monteath had died. His death occurred in Balfron, Stirlingshire on 9 March, at the age of 79.

References

Bibliography

External links
 

1941 births
2021 deaths
People from Perth, Scotland
Radio and television announcers
Scottish male soap opera actors
Scottish male television actors
Take the High Road